Anton Behme Burg (October 18, 1904 – November 18, 2003) was an American chemist. He was chairman of the University of Southern California chemistry department and an expert on boron.

Burg joined USC in 1939 as an assistant professor. He built up USC's chemistry department, making it one of the best chemistry departments in the United States by the 1950s. Burg retired in 1974.

During his time with Morris S. Kharasch at the University of Chicago, he worked with Herbert C. Brown, who won a Nobel Prize for his work following up on Burg's research.

References

1904 births
2003 deaths
20th-century American chemists
University of Southern California faculty
University of Chicago alumni